Piñero Island is an island,  long and  wide, lying about  northwest of Pourquoi Pas Island, off the west coast of Graham Land. It was discovered by the French Antarctic Expedition under J.B. Charcot, 1908–10, and named by him for Dr. Antonio F. Piñero, member of the Chamber of Deputies of the Argentine Republic, on whose motion the government voted unlimited credit to meet the needs of the expedition. The highest point in the island is Piñero Peak.

See also 
 List of Antarctic and sub-Antarctic islands

References

Islands of Graham Land
Fallières Coast